Joško Topić (born December 8, 1983) is a retired Croatian professional tennis player. 

Topić has a career high ATP singles ranking of 543 achieved on 29 July 2013. He also has a career high ATP doubles ranking of 405, achieved on 11 June 2006. Topić has won 1 ITF singles titles and 10 doubles titles. He played his only ATP Tour main draw match at the 2013 ATP Vegeta Croatia Open Umag, where he lost at the first round against Carlos Berlocq.

Future and Challenger finals

Singles: 1 (1–0)

References

External links

1983 births
Living people
Croatian male tennis players